Abu Hana (also Romanized as Abū Ḩanā; also known as Abū ’anā) is a village in Alamarvdasht Rural District, Alamarvdasht District, Lamerd County, Fars Province, Iran. At the 2006 census, its population was 90, in 17 families.

References 

Populated places in Lamerd County